Batocera roylei is a species of beetle in the family Cerambycidae. It was described by Hope in 1833. It is known from Borneo, Malaysia, Vietnam, and India. It feeds on Mangifera indica.

References

Batocerini
Beetles described in 1833